Hwang Kyo-Chung  (born 9 April 1985) is a South Korean footballer who plays as goalkeeper for Ulsan Hyundai Mipo in the Korea National League.

Club career statistics

External links 

1985 births
Living people
Association football goalkeepers
South Korean footballers
Pohang Steelers players
Gangwon FC players
Ulsan Hyundai Mipo Dockyard FC players
K League 1 players
K League 2 players
Korea National League players